Bradley Fritts is a Republican member-elect of the Illinois House of Representatives for the 74th district. The 74th district includes all or parts of DeKalb, LaSalle, Lee, Ogle, and Whiteside counties in north-central Illinois. Upon being sworn in, he will be the youngest member of the Illinois House of Representatives and its first member born after the year 2000.

Fritts has a bachelor's degree in agricultural and consumer economics from the University of Illinois at Urbana-Champaign. He is a farmer and substitute teacher by profession. A Republican precinct committeeman, Fritts comes from a politically active family; his father Edward Fritts is the township supervisor for Dixon Township and his late uncle John Fritts was the Lee County Treasurer.

Electoral history

2022
In the 2022 Republican primary, Fritts defeated fellow Republican and Mayor of Dixon Liandro Arellano and ran unopposed in the general election.

References

Living people
Place of birth missing (living people)
People from Dixon, Illinois
21st-century American politicians
Illinois Republicans
University of Illinois College of Agriculture, Consumer, and Environmental Sciences alumni
Farmers from Illinois
2002 births